The Fyn Power Station is a coal, straw and municipal waste-fired power station operated by Vattenfall in Odense, Denmark. It has eight units, three of which were operating : unit 3, unit 7, and unit 8. Unit 3 has a power of 235 MW (coal), unit 7 of 362 MW (coal), unit 8 of 35 MW biomass), and  Odense CHP plant 24 MW.

See also 

 List of power stations in Denmark

External links 
 Fyn Power Station (EnergyMap.dk)
 Fyn Power Station (Vattenfall)

Energy infrastructure completed in 1953
Coal-fired power stations in Denmark
Biomass power stations in Denmark
Cogeneration power stations in Denmark
Vattenfall
Buildings and structures in Odense